The Servicio de Inteligencia Militar (SIM) (English: Military Intelligence Service) was the main secret police force and death squad during the later part of the dictatorship of Rafael Trujillo to keep control within the Dominican Republic.

Operation
Around 1957 the Department of State for Security, headed by General Arturo Espaillat was dissolved, replaced by SIM and its sister agency, the Servicio Central de Inteligencia (SCI).  Under the leadership of Johnny Abbes García, SIM employed thousands of people and was involved in immigration, passports, censorship, supervision of aliens, and undercover work. At the Palace of Communications some fifty people intercepted and recorded domestic and foreign phone conversations.  Its secret activities used murder, kidnapping, extorsion and terror to achieve its goals. Money was spent to lobby American legislators.

In the population members of SIM were known as "caliés" (Thugs), they patrolled the streets in their black VW beetles called "cepillos" (brushes). Infamous detention centers were La Nueve (The Nine) and La Cuarenta (The Forty) where prisoners were tortured and killed. 

SIM was dissolved in 1962, after the fall of the Trujillo regime.

Directors

Famous operations
 1956: Murder of Jesús Galíndez
 1958: Murder of Octavio de la Maza
 1959: Attempt to invade Cuba
 1960: Murder of the Mirabal sisters
 1960: Attempt to assassinate Rómulo Betancourt
 1961: Murder of assassins of Trujillo

Cultural references
SIM and its leader Johnny Abbes García are frequently mentioned in Mario Vargas Llosa's historical novel, The Feast of the Goat.

References

Rafael Trujillo
1950s in the Dominican Republic
1960s in the Dominican Republic
Government agencies established in 1957
Government agencies disestablished in 1962
Defunct intelligence agencies
Dominican Republic intelligence agencies
Secret police
Anti-communist organizations